Wellington Olympic Association Football Club is a New Zealand amateur football club based in Berhampore, Wellington. The club's premier team competes in the Central League through which they have qualified for the New Zealand National League.

Club history
The club was formed in 1953 by Greek immigrants as Apollon AFC and is commonly known as 'The Greeks'. The club changed its name to Christian Youth FC (CYFC) in 1959, and became Wellington Olympic in 1983. The local Greek community continues to be the basis of the club's support and a significant number of players are of Greek heritage.

Current squad
Squad for the 2021 Central League

Staff
For 2022 season
Head coach: Rupert Kemeys
Assistant coach:   Jamie O'Connor 
Strength & Conditioning Coach:  James Mac Aodhagáin

Performance in OFC competitions

Honours

League records

Most Appearances

Harry Kotsapas, 377 games, 1973–1993
Nick Halikias,  354 games, 1975–1993
Alkis Ioannou,  260 games, 1975–1992
Chris Christie,  252 games, 1977–2002
Spiros Androutsos, 231 games, 1972–1995

Most Goals in a Season

Geoff Brown, 35 goals, 2004

Most Goals Top 5 Overall

Harry Kotsapas, 132 goals, 1973–1993
Chris Christie, 98 goals, 1977–2002
Imre Foldi, 87 goals,  1990–1999
Spiros Androutsos, 84 goals,  1972–1995
Jimmy Haidakis, 83 goals,  2003-

Notable players

 Leo Bertos
 Kosta Barbarouses
 Simon Elliott
 Raf de Gregorio
 Stu Jacobs
 Clayton Lewis

References

External links
Wellington Olympic AFC Website
The Ultimate New Zealand Soccer Website

Association football clubs in Wellington
Greek-New Zealand culture
Sport in Wellington City
Association football clubs established in 1953
1953 establishments in New Zealand
Diaspora sports clubs